The following list sorts countries and dependent territories by their net reproduction rate. The net reproduction rate (R0) is the number of surviving daughters per woman and an important indicator of the population's reproductive rate. If R0  is one, the population replaces itself and would stay without any migration and emigration at a stable level. If the R0 is less than one, the reproductive performance of the population is below replacement level.

List of countries (2021) 

Countries and dependent territories by the net reproduction rate in 2021 according to the World Population Prospects 2022 of the United Nations Department of Economic and Social Affairs.

References 

mean age at childbearing
mean age at childbearinge
Fertility